Channel 16 may refer to:

 Channel 16 (Bangladeshi TV channel), a defunct music entertainment television channel in Bangladesh
 Channel 16 VHF, a radio frequency on the marine VHF radio band

Canada
The following television stations broadcast on digital or analog channel 16 (UHF frequencies covering 482-488 MHz) in Canada:
 CHBC-TV-5 in Enderby, British Columbia
 CHWI-DT in Windsor, Ontario

The following television stations operate on virtual channel 16 in Canada:
 CFKM-DT in Trois-Rivières, Quebec
 CHWI-DT in Windsor, Ontario

Mexico
The following stations broadcast on virtual channel 16 in Mexico:

 Sistema Michoacano de Radio y Televisión in the state of Michoacán
 SET Televisión in the state of Puebla
 XETV-TDT (Nu9ve subchannel) in Tijuana, Baja California

See also
 Channel 16 TV stations in Mexico
 Channel 16 branded TV stations in the United States
 Channel 16 digital TV stations in the United States
 Channel 16 low-power TV stations in the United States
 Channel 16 virtual TV stations in the United States

16